Asmalı Konak ("The Mansion with Vines") was a Turkish TV series directed by Çağan Irmak and written by Mahinur Ergun and Meral Okay. It was shown on ATV for a total of 54 episodes. The series was followed by a sequel, released as a feature film titled Asmalı Konak: Hayat.

Plot
The  Karadağs are a wealthy family that owns vast estates in Cappadocia. Their heir Seymen goes to study in New York where he meets Bahar, the daughter of a family from İstanbul. They fall in love, get married and move to the Karadağs' ancestral home, the "Asmalı Konak".

Cast

References

External links

2002 Turkish television series debuts
2004 Turkish television series endings
Turkish drama television series
Television series by D Productions
2000s Turkish television series
ATV (Turkey) original programming
Television shows set in Istanbul
Television series produced in Istanbul
Turkish television series endings